The Arts Club of Washington is a private club to promote the Arts in Washington, D.C.

Founded by Bertha Noyes in May 1916, its first president was Henry Kirke Bush-Brown; Mathilde Mueden Leisenring was among its original members, as were Susan Brown Chase, Catharine Carter Critcher, Lola Sleeth Miller, Bertha E. Perrie, and Mary Gine Riley.

It is located at the Cleveland Abbe House. Since 2006, the Club has awarded the Marfield Prize, also known as the National Award for Arts Writing, for nonfiction books about the arts written for a broad audience.

Programs 
The club supports visual, performing, and literary arts in Washington, D.C. It hosts a noon-time concert series. It awards arts scholarships.

The Marfield Prize, National Award for Arts Writing 
The Marfield Prize, also known as the National Award for Arts Writing, is given annually by the Arts Club of Washington to nonfiction books about the arts written for a broad audience. Intended to help increase access to the arts, the Prize "celebrates prose that is lucid, luminous, clear, and inspiring—writing that creates a strong connection with arts and artists."

The Prize of $10,000, which the Club asserts is the only one of its kind in the country, honors nonfiction books first published in the U.S., by a single author who is living at the time of the book’s nomination. First given in 2006, the prize’s endowment was established by long-time Arts Club member Jeannie S. Marfield in honor of Florence Berryman and Helen Wharton.

The award is given to the author of a nonfiction book about any artistic discipline (visual, literary, performing, or media arts, as well as cross-disciplinary works. Works of art history and criticism, biographies and memoirs, and essays are all eligible. Anthologies, creative works of fiction or poetry, books for children, exhibition catalogs and self-published books are not eligible.

Members of the club noticed that there was a lack of "good, accessible writing about the arts," according to former award administrator Sarah Browning. Club members decided to use a bequest by longtime member Jeannie S. Marfield to remedy the situation. In addition to the annual winners, the Club publishes the names of several finalists.

List of winners

References

External links
Official website
 Arts Club of Washington, D.C. Collection, 1916-1990, DC Library
 Arts Club of Washington scrapbooks, 1916-1991, Archives of American Art

Arts organizations based in Washington, D.C.
Non-profit organizations based in Washington, D.C.
Arts organizations established in 1916
1916 establishments in Washington, D.C.